John James Wrathall, GCLM, ID (28 August 1913 – 31 August 1978), was a Rhodesian politician. He was the last white President of Rhodesia (later holders of the post were only acting as such). He formerly worked as a chartered accountant.

Early life
Wrathall was born in Lancaster in Lancashire, Great Britain, and went to Lancaster Royal Grammar School. Having qualified as a chartered accountant in 1935, he emigrated to Southern Rhodesia the next year. He worked for the Southern Rhodesian Government in its income tax department for the next ten years.

Rhodesian career
In 1946 Wrathall set up in private practice as an accountant in Bulawayo and also became involved in politics. In 1949 he was elected to Bulawayo City Council, where he served for a decade. Wrathall was elected to the Legislative Assembly for Bulawayo South in the 1954 general election, as a member of the United Federal Party, then led by Garfield Todd, but stood down after one term in 1958.

Ministerial office
By 1962 Wrathall was no longer a supporter of the United Federal Party and became a founder member of the Rhodesian Front under Winston Field. He was elected in Bulawayo North in the December 1962 election under the RF banner, defeating the incumbent, Cyril Hatty, by 67 votes. As one of the party's most experienced members, in October 1963 he was made Minister of African Education. A month later he also took on the Ministry of Health, which was being transferred from the Federation of Rhodesia and Nyasaland on its demise at the end of 1963.

Wrathall was among the members of the Rhodesian Front who deposed Winston Field and instead installed Ian Smith as Prime Minister in April 1964. Smith promoted him to be Minister of Finance and of Posts and Telecommunications. As such, he was one of the signatories to the Unilateral Declaration of Independence (UDI) on 11 November 1965. He was Deputy Prime Minister from 7 September 1966. Known as "the quiet man of Rhodesian politics", he nevertheless was a key figure in the secret struggle against United Nations sanctions imposed after UDI.

As Minister of Finance, Wrathall also oversaw the adoption of a new decimal currency to replace the Rhodesian pound, known as the Rhodesian dollar, a name which he regarded as having international substance.

In July 1973 Wrathall ceded his responsibility as Minister of Posts; during the 1974 general election he stood down from the House of Assembly and transferred to the Senate. In 1975 he presented his 12th (and last) consecutive Budget as Rhodesia's longest serving Minister of Finance.

Presidency
In 1976, Wrathall became the second President of Rhodesia, succeeding Clifford Dupont. 
On 14 January of that year, he was sworn in as president by the Chief Justice, Sir Hugh Beadle, in a ceremony at Government House witnessed by Prime Minister Ian Smith and his Cabinet ministers. Wrathall served for two and a half years, and died in office of a heart attack.

References

External links
Rhodesian Prime Minister, Ian Smith, President John Wrathall and his wife Doreen, attend opening of Parliament in Salisbury, 22 June 1977, AP Archive
Funeral of President John Wrathall – 5000 line streets, 7 September 1978, AP Archive

|-

|-

|-

1913 births
1978 deaths
People from Lancaster, Lancashire
White Rhodesian people
People educated at Lancaster Royal Grammar School
Presidents of Rhodesia
Deputy Prime Ministers of Rhodesia
Members of the Legislative Assembly of Southern Rhodesia
Members of the Parliament of Rhodesia
Finance ministers of Rhodesia
Rhodesian Front politicians
British emigrants to Rhodesia
Zimbabwean people of English descent
Signatories of Rhodesia's Unilateral Declaration of Independence